Trönninge is a locality situated in Halmstad Municipality, Halland County, Sweden, with 1,645 inhabitants in 2020.

References 

Halmstad
Populated places in Halland County
Populated places in Halmstad Municipality